1992 was designated as International Space Year by the United Nations.

Events

January
 January 1 – Boutros Boutros-Ghali of Egypt replaces Javier Pérez de Cuéllar of Peru as United Nations Secretary-General.
 January 6
 The Nagorno-Karabakh Republic is proclaimed by the Armenians of Nagorno-Karabakh.
 1991–92 Georgian coup d'état: President of Georgia Zviad Gamsakhurdia flees the country as a result of the military coup.
 January 7 – 1992 European Community Monitor Mission helicopter downing: A Yugoslav Air Force Mikoyan-Gurevich MiG-21 attacks two Italian Army Agusta-Bell AB-206L LongRanger helicopters carrying observers from the European Community Monitor Mission. One crashes, killing five people on board. The other helicopter crash-lands, but its occupants survive.
 January 9
 Bosnian Serbs declare their own republic within Bosnia and Herzegovina, in protest of the decision by Bosniaks and Bosnian Croats to seek recognition by the European Communities.
 First confirmed detection of exoplanets with announcement of the discovery of several terrestrial-mass planets orbiting the pulsar PSR B1257+12, by radio astronomers Aleksander Wolszczan and Dale Frail working in the United States.
 January 15 – The Socialist Federal Republic of Yugoslavia begins to break up; Slovenia and Croatia gain independence and international recognition in some Western countries.
 January 16 – El Salvador officials and rebel leaders sign the Chapultepec Peace Accords in Mexico City, ending the 12-year Salvadoran Civil War that claimed at least 75,000 lives.
 January 19
In the Bulgarian presidential election, the first held by direct vote, Zhelyu Zhelev, leader of the Union of Democratic Forces, retains office.
 Paramount Leader of China Deng Xiaoping speaks in Shenzhen during his southern tour, a move that would return China on its right-wing march towards free market economics.
 January 22 – Rebel forces occupy Zaire's national radio station in Kinshasa and broadcast a demand for the government's resignation.
 January 24 – China and Israel establish diplomatic relations.
 January 26
 Boris Yeltsin announces that Russia will stop targeting cities of the United States and its allies with nuclear weapons. In return President George H. W. Bush announces that the United States and its allies will stop targeting Russia and the remaining communist states with nuclear weapons.
In Mauritania, security forces open fire on opponents of President of Mauritania Maaouya Ould Sid'Ahmed Taya, killing at least five people.
 January 27 – First Nagorno-Karabakh War: in the disputed territory of Nagorno-Karabakh, fighting between Armenians and Azeris leaves at least 60 people dead.
 January 30 – North Korea signs an accord with the International Atomic Energy Agency allowing for international inspections of North Korea's nuclear power plants.

February
 February 1 – President of the United States George H. W. Bush meets with President of Russia Boris Yeltsin at Camp David, where they formally declare that the Cold War is over.
 February 3 – South African State President F.W. de Klerk and Nelson Mandela, African National Congress leader, are jointly awarded the Felix Houphouet-Boigny Peace Prize at the UNESCO headquarters in Paris.
 February 4 – In Venezuela, Hugo Chávez leads an unsuccessful coup attempt against President of Venezuela Carlos Andrés Pérez.
 February 6 – Queen Elizabeth II of the United Kingdom and other Commonwealth realms celebrates her Ruby Jubilee, marking 40 years since her accession to the thrones of the United Kingdom, Canada, Australia and New Zealand.
 February 7 – The Maastricht Treaty is signed, founding the European Union.
 February 8 – The opening ceremony for the 1992 Winter Olympics is held in Albertville, France.
 February 9 – Algerian Civil War: The government of Algeria declares a state of emergency and begins a crackdown on the Islamic Salvation Front.
 February 14 – Ukraine and four other nations in the Commonwealth of Independent States reject Russia's proposal to maintain unified armed forces. Ukraine, Moldova and Azerbaijan announce they will go ahead with plans to create their own military forces.
 February 16 – In Lebanon, Israeli helicopter gunships assassinate Abbas al-Musawi, the leader of Hezbollah, and his son, in retaliation for a February 14 raid that killed three Israeli soldiers.
 February 17 – A court in Milwaukee, Wisconsin sentences serial killer Jeffrey Dahmer to 15 terms of life in prison. Dahmer is murdered in prison 2 years later.
 February 18 – Iraq disarmament crisis: The Executive Chairman of UNSCOM details Iraq's refusal to abide by UN Security Council disarmament resolutions.
 February 21 – The United Nations Security Council approves Resolution 743 to send a UNPROFOR peacekeeping force to Yugoslavia.
 February 25–26 – 613 Azerbaijani civilians are massacred in Khojaly.
 February 26 – The Supreme Court of Ireland rules that a 14-year-old rape victim may travel to the United Kingdom to have an abortion.
 February 28 – Ownership of the port town of Walvis Bay is transferred from South Africa to Namibia.

March
 March 1 – The first victims of the Bosnian War are a Serb bridegroom's father and an Orthodox priest in a Sarajevo shooting. In the Bosnian independence referendum, held from February 29 to March 1 and boycotted by Bosnian Serbs, the majority of the Bosniak and Bosnian Croat communities have voted for Bosnia-Herzegovina's  independence.
 March 2 – In Dubăsari, Moldova, escalating tensions turn into open hostilities and the beginning of the Transnistria War.
 March 4 – The Supreme Court of Algeria bans the Islamic Salvation Front, which is poised to win control of the Parliament of Algeria in runoff elections.
 March 9 – The People's Republic of China ratifies the Nuclear Non-Proliferation Treaty.
 March 12 – Mauritius becomes a republic while remaining a member of the Commonwealth of Nations.
 March 13 – The 6.7  Erzincan earthquake affects eastern Turkey with a maximum Mercalli intensity of VIII (Severe), killing 498–652 and injuring around 2,000.
 March 18 – White South Africans vote in favour of political reforms which will end the apartheid regime and create a power-sharing multi-racial government.
 March 22
In French regional elections, the conservative Rally for the Republic and the centre-right Union for French Democracy win in a landslide, capturing 20 of 22 metropolitan regional presidencies.
 STS-45: Space Shuttle Atlantis takes off from Cape Canaveral carrying instruments designed to study global warming.
 March 24 – The Treaty on Open Skies is signed in Helsinki, Finland, to establish a program of unarmed surveillance flights over the 34 member states. It went into effect on January 1, 2002.
 March 25
The International Atomic Energy Agency orders Iraq to destroy an industrial complex at Al Atheer that is being used to manufacture nuclear weapons.
 Pakistan beats England in the final to win the Cricket World Cup for the very first time.
 March 31 – The Maintenance of Religious Harmony Act of Singapore comes into force.

April

 April 5
The Assembly of Bosnia and Herzegovina (without the presence of Serb political delegates) proclaims independence from the Socialist Federal Republic of Yugoslavia.
 Bosnian War: Serb troops, following a mass rebellion of Serbs in Bosnia and Herzegovina against the Bosnian declaration of independence from Yugoslavia, besiege the city of Sarajevo.
 President of Peru Alberto Fujimori issues Decree Law 25418, dissolving the Congress of the Republic of Peru, imposing censorship and having opposition politicians arrested, setting off the 1992 Peruvian constitutional crisis.
 April 6 – The Republic of Ilirida is proclaimed by Albanian Macedonian activists in Struga, Republic of Macedonia.
 April 7 – The United States recognizes the independence of Slovenia, Croatia, and Bosnia and Herzegovina. The European Communities also recognizes Bosnia and Herzegovina.
 April 9
A Miami jury convicts former Panamanian ruler Manuel Noriega of assisting Colombia's cocaine cartel.
In the United Kingdom general election the Conservative Party led by Prime Minister of the United Kingdom John Major narrowly retains power.
 April 10
 First Nagorno-Karabakh War: Maraga massacre – At least 43 Armenian civilians are killed as their village of Maraga, Azerbaijan, is captured and destroyed by the Azerbaijani Armed Forces. 
A Provisional Irish Republican Army bomb explodes at the Baltic Exchange in the City of London; three are killed, 91 injured.
 April 13 – The 5.3  Roermond earthquake affects the Netherlands, Germany and Belgium with a maximum Mercalli intensity of VII (Very strong).
 April 15 – The National Assembly of Vietnam adopts the 1992 Constitution of the Socialist Republic of Vietnam.
 April 16 – President of Afghanistan Mohammad Najibullah is ousted and detained by Muslim rebels moving towards Kabul, setting the stage for the civil war in Afghanistan (1992–96).
 April 20 – The Freddie Mercury Tribute Concert, held at Wembley Stadium, London, is televised live to over one billion people and raises millions of dollars for AIDS research.
 April 21 – The death of Grand Duke Vladimir Kirillovich of Russia results in a succession dispute between Nicholas Romanov, Prince of Russia and Vladimir's daughter Maria for the leadership of the Imperial Family of Russia.
 April 22 – Fuel leaking into a sewer causes a series of explosions in Guadalajara, Mexico; 215 are killed, 1,500 injured.
 April 27 – Betty Boothroyd becomes the first woman elected Speaker of the House of Commons of the United Kingdom.
 April 28 – The two remaining constituent republics of the former Socialist Federal Republic of Yugoslavia – Serbia and Montenegro – form a new state, named the Federal Republic of Yugoslavia (which in 2003 becomes Serbia and Montenegro), bringing to an end the official state union of Serbs, Croats, Slovenes, Montenegrins, Bosniaks and Macedonians that has existed since 1918 (with the exception of an occupation period during World War II).
 April 29
 Los Angeles riots: The acquittal of four police officers in the Rodney King beating criminal trial triggers massive rioting in Los Angeles. The riots will last for six days resulting in 63 deaths and over $1 billion in damages before order is restored by the military.
In Sierra Leone, a group of young soldiers launch a military coup that sends president Joseph Saidu Momoh into exile in Guinea, and the National Provisional Ruling Council (NPRC) is established with 25-year-old Captain Valentine Strasser as its chairman and Head of State of the country.

May
 May 1 – Lithuania introduces a new temporary currency, the talonas.
 May 5
Russian leaders in Crimea declare their separation from Ukraine as a new republic. They withdraw the secession on May 10.
 Armand Césari Stadium disaster in Bastia on Corsica: 18 people are killed and 2,300 are injured when one of the terraces collapses before a football match between SC Bastia and Olympique de Marseille.
 May 7
STS-49: Space Shuttle Endeavour makes its maiden flight, as a replacement for Space Shuttle Challenger.
In the Sydney River McDonald's murders in Nova Scotia, Canada, three McDonald's employees are killed and a fourth is left permanently disabled during a botched robbery.
 May 9
 The United Nations Framework Convention on Climate Change is adopted in New York.
 The Westray Mine in Plymouth, Nova Scotia, Canada, explodes, killing all 26 miners working the night shift. 
 May 10 – Sweden wins the Ice Hockey World Championships in Czechoslovakia defeating Finland, 5–2, in the final game in Prague.
 May 13 – Falun Gong is introduced by Li Hongzhi in China.
 May 15 – The Collective Security Treaty Organization is established by six post-Soviet states belonging to the Commonwealth of Independent States (effective April 20, 1994).
May 16–17 – Bosnian War: U.N. peacekeepers withdraw from Sarajevo.
May 17 – Protests begin in Bangkok, Thailand, against the government of General Suchinda Kraprayoon, sparking a bloody crackdown.
May 23 – Capaci bombing: A Mafia bomb on the autostrada in Sicily kills five people, including Italian anti-Mafia judge Giovanni Falcone.
May 24
In Thailand, Suchinda Kraprayoon agrees to resign.
Parliamentary election held in Burkina Faso, for the first time since 1978.
May 30 – United Nations Security Council Resolution 757 imposes economic sanctions on Yugoslavia in an effort to end its attacks on Bosnia and Herzegovina.

June
 June 2 – In a national referendum Denmark rejects the Maastricht Treaty by a narrow margin.
 June 3–14 – The Earth Summit is held in Rio de Janeiro.
 June 8 – The first World Oceans Day is celebrated, coinciding with the Earth Summit held in Rio de Janeiro, Brazil.
June 10–26 – Sweden hosts the UEFA Euro 1992 football tournament, which is won by Denmark.
June 16 – A "Joint Understanding" agreement on arms reduction is signed by U.S. President George H. W. Bush and Russian President Boris Yeltsin (this is later codified in START II).
June 17
 Two German relief workers held since 1989, Thomas Kemptner and Heinrich Struebig, are handed over to the German authorities after their release; they are the last Western hostages in Lebanon.
 Violence breaks out between the African National Congress and the Inkatha Freedom Party in Boipatong, South Africa, leaving 46 dead.
June 18 – Ireland votes for the Eleventh Amendment of the Constitution of Ireland to accept the Maastricht Treaty with a popular vote of over 69%.
June 20
 Estonia adopts the kroon as currency, becoming the first former Soviet Republic to replace the Soviet rouble.
 In Paraguay the National Constituent Assembly approves the new Constitution of Paraguay.
June 21 – Nelson Mandela announces that the African National Congress will halt negotiations with the government of South Africa following the Boipatong massacre of June 17.
June 23 – The Israeli legislative election is won by the Israeli Labor Party under the leadership of Yitzhak Rabin, ousting a Likud government.
June 25 – The Black Sea Economic Cooperation (BSEC) is founded.
June 26 – Denmark beats Germany 2–0 in the final to win the 1992 UEFA European Football Championship at Ullevi Stadium in Gothenburg, Sweden.
June 28 – Estonia holds a referendum on its constitution, which will come into effect on July 3.

July
July 6–8 – The 18th G7 summit is held in Munich.
July 6–29 – Iraq disarmament crisis: Iraq refuses a U.N. inspection team access to the Iraqi Ministry of Agriculture. UNSCOM claims that it has reliable information that the site contains archives related to illegal weapons activities. U.N. inspectors stage a 17-day "sit-in" outside of the building, but leave when their safety is threatened by Iraqi soldiers.
July 10
In Miami, former Panamanian dictator Manuel Noriega is sentenced to 40 years in prison for participating in the illegal drug trade and racketeering.
The Giotto spacecraft flies past Comet 26P/Grigg–Skjellerup, gathering measurements about the comet.
July 13 – Yitzhak Rabin becomes prime minister of Israel.
July 16 – At the 1992 Democratic National Convention, Arkansas Governor Bill Clinton accepts his party's presidential nomination on behalf of the "forgotten middle class".
July 17 – The Slovak National Council declares Slovakia an independent country, signaling the breakup of Czechoslovakia.
July 19
Via D'Amelio bombing: A car bomb placed by the Sicilian Mafia (with the collaboration of Italian intelligence) kills judge Paolo Borsellino and five members of his police escort.
The Cabinet of Israel approves a freeze on new Israeli settlement in the occupied territories, a move expected to reinvigorate the Middle East Peace Process.
July 20 – Václav Havel resigns as president of Czechoslovakia.
July 21 – Transnistria War ends with a ceasefire.
July 22 – Near Medellín, Colombian drug lord Pablo Escobar escapes from his luxury prison, fearing extradition to the United States.
July 23 – Abkhazia declares independence from Georgia.
July 25–August 9 – The 1992 Summer Olympics are held in Barcelona, Catalonia, Spain.
July 26 – Iraq agrees to allow U.N. weapons inspectors to search the Iraqi Agricultural Ministry building in Baghdad. When inspectors arrive on July 28 and 29, they find nothing and voice suspicions that Iraqi records have been removed.
July 31
Georgia becomes the 179th member of the United Nations after seceding from the Soviet Union the previous year.
Thai Airways International Flight 311, an Airbus A310-300, crashes into a mountain north of Kathmandu, Nepal killing all 113 people on board.
China General Aviation Flight 7552 bound for Xiamen crashes soon after taking off from Nanjing Dajiaochang Airport, killing 108 of the 116 people on board.

August
August 3–4 – Millions of black South Africans participate in a general strike called by the African National Congress to protest the lack of progress in negotiations with the government of State President of South Africa F. W. de Klerk.
August 12 – Canada, Mexico and the United States announce that a deal has been reached on the North American Free Trade Agreement; this will be formally signed on December 17.
August 18 – Prime Minister of the United Kingdom John Major announces the creation of Iraqi no-fly zones (→ Operation Southern Watch).
August 24
Concordia University massacre: Valery Fabrikant murders four colleagues and seriously wounds another in a shooting at Concordia University, in Montreal, Quebec.
China and South Korea establish diplomatic relations.
August 24–28 – Hurricane Andrew hits south Florida and Louisiana and dissipates over the Tennessee valley when it merges with a storm system; 23 are killed.
August 29 – In Rostock, Germany, tens of thousands rally to protest neo-Nazi attacks on refugees and immigrants begun on August 22.

September
September 1 – In Beijing, police arrest Shen Tong for his role in organizing the Tiananmen Square protests of 1989.
September 2 – The 7.7  Nicaragua earthquake affects the west coast of Nicaragua. With a – disparity of half a unit, this tsunami earthquake triggers a tsunami that causes most of the damage and casualties, with at least 116 killed.
September 7
In Ciskei, members of the Ciskei Defence Force loyal to dictator Oupa Gqozo open fire into a crowd of anti-Gqozo protestors organized by the African National Congress, killing at least 28 people and wounding nearly 200.
President of Tajikistan Rahmon Nabiyev is forced to resign following weeks of clan and religious warfare that have left nearly 2,000 people dead.
September 11 – Hurricane Iniki hits the Hawaiian Islands, Kauai and Oahu.
September 12 – In Peru, police arrest Abimael Guzmán, the leader of the Shining Path guerilla movement, who has evaded capture for 12 years.
September 16 – Black Wednesday: The pound sterling and the Italian lira are forced out of the European Exchange Rate Mechanism.
September 17 – Two Kurdish opposition leaders are assassinated by the Iranian Kazem Darabi and the Lebanese Abbas Rhayel.
September 20 – French voters narrowly approve the Maastricht Treaty in the French Maastricht Treaty referendum.
September 21 – Mexico establishes diplomatic relations with Vatican City, ending a break that has lasted over 130 years.
September 28 – Law enforcement officials in the United States, Colombia and Italy announce that they have arrested more than 165 people on money laundering charges related to cocaine trafficking.
September 29 – The Chamber of Deputies of Brazil votes to impeach President of Brazil Fernando Collor de Mello, the country's first democratically elected leader in 29 years. Vice President Itamar Franco becomes acting president.

October
October 2 – A riot breaks out in the Carandiru Penitentiary in São Paulo, Brazil, resulting in the Carandiru massacre.
October 3 – After performing a song protesting against alleged Catholic Church child sexual abuse, Irish singer-songwriter Sinéad O'Connor rips up a photograph of Pope John Paul II on the US television programme Saturday Night Live, causing huge controversy.
October 4
The government of Mozambique signs the Rome General Peace Accords with leaders of RENAMO, ending the 16-year-old Mozambican Civil War.
Israeli cargo plane El Al Flight 1862 crashes into residential buildings in Amsterdam's Bijlmermeer, Netherlands, after taking off from Schiphol Airport and losing two engines, killing all 4 people on board and 39 on the ground.
October 6 – Lennart Meri becomes the first President of Estonia after regaining independence. The Estonian Government in Exile resigns on the next day.
October 7 – In Peru, Shining Path leader Abimael Guzmán is convicted of treason and sentenced to life in prison.
October 11 – The Catechism of the Catholic Church is promulgated by Pope John Paul II with his apostolic constitution, Fidei depositum.
October 12
In the Dominican Republic, Pope John Paul II celebrates the 500th anniversary of the meeting of two cultures.
The 5.8  Cairo earthquake affects the city with a maximum Mercalli intensity of VIII (Severe), leaving 545 dead and 6,512 injured.
October 19 – The Chinese Communist Party promotes several market-oriented reformers to the Politburo Standing Committee of the Chinese Communist Party, signaling a defeat for hard-line ideologues.
October 21 – 150,000 coal miners march in London to protest government plans to close coal mines and reduce the number of miners.
October 23 – Emperor of Japan Akihito begins the first imperial visit to China, telling a Beijing audience he feels deep sorrow for the suffering of the Chinese people during World War II.
October 25 – Lithuania holds a referendum on its first constitution after declaring independence from the Soviet Union in 1990.
October 26 – In a national referendum, voters in Canada reject the Charlottetown Accord.
October 31 – Pope John Paul II issues an apology and lifts the 1633 edict of the Inquisition against Galileo Galilei.

November
November 3 – In the 1992 United States presidential election, Democratic Arkansas Governor Bill Clinton defeats Republican President  George H. W. Bush and Independent Ross Perot.
November 8 – More than 350,000 people rally in Berlin to protest right-wing violence against immigrants; stones and eggs are thrown at President of Germany Richard von Weizsäcker and Chancellor of Germany Helmut Kohl.
November 11 – The Church of England votes to allow women to become priests.
November 13
The government of Peru announces it has arrested a small group of army officers who were plotting the assassination of President Alberto Fujimori.
A report by the World Meteorological Organization reports an unprecedented level of ozone depletion in both the Arctic and Antarctic.
 November 14 –  In poor conditions caused by Cyclone Forrest, Vietnam Airlines Flight 474 crashes near Nha Trang, killing 30.
November 15 – The Lithuanian parliamentary election sees the Communists of the Democratic Labour Party of Lithuania, led by Algirdas Brazauskas, return to power.
November 18 – Russian President Boris Yeltsin releases the flight data recorder (FDR) and cockpit voice recorder (CVR) of Korean Air Flight 007, which was shot down by the Soviets in 1983.
November 24 – In China, China Southern Airlines Flight 3943, a China Southern Airlines domestic flight, crashes, killing all 141 people on board.
November 25
The Czechoslovakia Federal Assembly votes to split the country into the Czech Republic and Slovakia, starting on January 1, 1993.
In a national referendum related to abortion, voters in Ireland reject the proposed Twelfth Amendment of the Constitution Bill 1992 but approve the Thirteenth Amendment of the Constitution of Ireland and the Fourteenth Amendment of the Constitution of Ireland.
November 27 – The government of Venezuela puts down a coup attempt by a group of Air Force officers who have bombed the presidential palace.

December
December 1 – South Korea and South Africa reestablish diplomatic relations. South Korea previously had diplomatic relations with South Africa from 1961 to 1978, when they were severed by the former due to the latter's policy of apartheid.
December 3 – UN Security Council Resolution 794 is unanimously passed, approving a coalition of United Nations peacekeepers led by the United States to form UNITAF, tasked with ensuring that humanitarian aid gets distributed and establishing peace in Somalia.
December 4 – U.S. military forces land in Somalia.
December 6 – Demolition of Babri Masjid: Extremist Hindu activists in India demolish Babri Masjid – a 16th-century mosque in Ayodhya which has been used as a temple since 1949 – leading to widespread communal violence, including the Bombay riots, in all killing over 1,500 people.
December 12 – The 7.8  Flores earthquake affects the Lesser Sunda Islands in Indonesia with a maximum Mercalli intensity of VIII (Severe) leaving at least 2,500 dead. A destructive tsunami with wave heights of  follows.
December 16 – The Czech National Council adopts the Constitution of the Czech Republic.
December 18 – The South Korean presidential election is won by Kim Young-sam, the first non-military candidate elected since 1961.
December 21 – President of Serbia Slobodan Milošević defeats Milan Panić in the Serbian presidential election.
December 22 – The Archives of Terror are discovered by Dr. Martín Almada in Asunción, detailing the fates of thousands of Latin Americans who have been secretly kidnapped, tortured and killed by the security services of Argentina, Bolivia, Brazil, Chile, Paraguay and Uruguay in Operation Condor.

Births

January

 January 1
 Shane Duffy, Irish footballer
 He Kexin, Chinese artistic gymnast
 January 3 – Gao Lei, Chinese trampoline gymnast
 January 4
 Sajjad Ganjzadeh, Iranian karateka
 Quincy Promes, Dutch footballer
 January 5
Trent Sainsbury, Australian footballer
Suki Waterhouse, English model and actress
 January 7 
 Edgaras Ulanovas, Lithuanian basketball player
 Jessica Rossi, Italian shooter
 January 8 
 Lindsey Coffey, American fashion model, activist and beauty queen who was crowned Miss Earth 2020.
 Stefanie Dolson, American basketball player
 Koke, Spanish footballer
 January 9 – Fang Bo, Chinese table tennis player
 January 10
 Christian Atsu, Ghanaian footballer (d. 2023)
 Šime Vrsaljko, Croatian footballer
 January 11 – Dani Carvajal, Spanish footballer  
 January 13 – Santiago Arias, Colombian footballer 
 January 14 – Robbie Brady, Irish footballer 
 January 16 – Maja Keuc, Slovenian singer
 January 19
 Shawn Johnson East, American Olympic gymnast
 Logan Lerman, American actor
 Mac Miller, American rapper, singer-songwriter, and record producer (d. 2018)
 January 23 – Xu Anqi, Chinese fencer
 January 26
 Vincent Aboubakar, Cameroonian footballer
 Sasha Banks, American professional wrestler
 January 31 
 Tyler Seguin, Canadian ice hockey player
 Hanna Solovey, Ukrainian road and track racing cyclist

February

 February 5
 Neymar, Brazilian footballer
 Stefan de Vrij, Dutch footballer
 February 6 – Nora Fatehi, Canadian actress, model, dancer, singer, and producer
 February 7 – Sergi Roberto, Spanish footballer
 February 8 – Misaki Matsutomo, Japanese badminton player
 February 9 – Avan Jogia, Canadian actor
 February 10 
 Pauline Ferrand-Prévot, French multi-discipline bicycle racer
Karen Fukuhara, American actress and voice actress
 Haruka Nakagawa, Japanese-Indonesian artist
Kevin Mayer, French decathlete
 February 11
 Taylor Lautner, American actor and model
 Lasse Norman Hansen, Dutch track cyclist
 February 13 – Marharyta Makhneva, Belarusian sprint canoeist
 February 14
 Christian Eriksen, Danish footballer
 Freddie Highmore, English actor
 February 16 – Xu Shixiao, Chinese sprint canoeist
 February 17 – Meaghan Martin, American actress and singer
 February 19 – Camille Kostek, American model
 February 22 – Haris Seferovic, Swiss footballer
 February 23
 Casemiro, Brazilian footballer
 Samara Weaving, Australian actress
 February 25 – Hideki Matsuyama, Japanese golfer
 February 26
 Alexandria Mills, American model and beauty queen who was crowned Miss World 2010.
 Demet Özdemir, Turkish actress
 February 27 – Massimo Stano, Italian racewalker
 February 29 – Saphir Taïder, Algerian footballer

March

 March 1 – Tom Walsh, New Zealand athlete
 March 4 – Nataša Stanković, Serbian actress, dancer and model
 March 6 
 Samuel Bankman-Fried, American businessman
 Momoko Tsugunaga, Japanese singer
 March 7 – Vanessa Ponce, Mexican model and beauty queen who was crowned Miss World 2018.
 March 9 
 Cornelia Jakobs, Swedish singer
 María Eugenia Suárez, Argentine actress and model
 March 10 – Emily Osment, American actress, singer, and songwriter
 March 13
 Lucy Fry, Australian actress
 Kaya Scodelario, English actress and model
 March 17 – John Boyega, English actor
 March 21 – Karolína Plíšková, Czech tennis player 
 March 22 – Jessie Andrews, American adult film actress, designer, producer, model, DJ, entrepreneur and photographer.
 March 23
 Ana Marcela Cunha, Brazilian swimmer
 Kyrie Irving, American-Australian basketball player
 Vanessa Morgan, Canadian actress and singer
 March 25 – Elizabeth Lail, American actress
 March 26 
 Nina Agdal, Danish model
 Stoffel Vandoorne, Belgian racing driver
 March 27 – Aoi Yūki, Japanese actress and singer
 March 30 – Enrique Gil, Filipino actor, dancer and singer
 March 31 – Giselle Ansley, British field hockey player

April

 April 1 – Sui Lu, Chinese artistic gymnast
 April 3 – Ana Bjelica, Serbian volleyball player
 April 7 – Alexis Jordan, American singer and actress
 April 8
 Mathew Ryan, Australian footballer
 Shelby Young, American actress
 April 10 
 Sadio Mané, Senegalese footballer
 Daisy Ridley, English actress
 April 12 – Chad le Clos, South African Olympic swimmer
 April 13 – George North, Welsh rugby player
 April 15 
 Amy Deasismont, Swedish pop musician
 Ricarda Funk, German slalom canoeist
 Alice Volpi, Italian fencer
 April 16 – Prince Sébastien of Luxembourg
 April 17 – Shkodran Mustafi, German footballer
 April 18 – Chloe Bennet, American actress and singer
 April 21
 Isco, Spanish footballer
 Deng Linlin, Chinese gymnast
 April 22 
 Ali Farag, Egyptian professional squash player
 Rolene Strauss, South African beauty pageant titleholder who won Miss World 2014
 April 24 
 Laura Kenny, British cyclist
 Rafaela Silva, Brazilian judoka
 April 28 – Christabelle Borg, Maltese singer and television presenter

May

 May 1 – Hani, South Korean singer and entertainer
 May 2 – Boniface Tumuti, Kenyan sprinter
 May 3 
 Kejsi Tola, Albanian singer
 Melissa Wu, Australian diver
 May 4
 Phyllis Francis, American track and field athlete
 Victor Oladipo, American basketball player
 May 6
 Byun Baek-hyun, South Korean singer, songwriter, and actor
 Jonas Valančiūnas, Lithuanian basketball player
 May 7 
 Ryan Harrison, American tennis player
 May 8
 Olivia Culpo, American fashion influencer
 Alexander Ludwig, Canadian actor
 May 10 – Jake Zyrus, Filipino singer
 May 11 
 Thibaut Courtois, Belgian footballer
 Pablo Sarabia, Spanish footballer
 May 12 – Volha Khudzenka, Belarusian sprint canoeist
 May 17 – Srećko Lisinac, Serbian volleyball player
 May 18 
 Spencer Breslin, American actor and musician
 Shona McCallin, British field hockey player
 May 19 – Sam Smith, English singer and songwriter
 May 20 – Cate Campbell, Australian swimmer
 May 27 – Laurence Vincent Lapointe, Canadian sprint canoeist
 May 28 – Gaku Shibasaki, Japanese footballer
 May 30 – Harrison Barnes, American basketball player

June

 June 3 
 Mario Götze, German footballer
 Monika Linkytė, Lithuanian singer and songwriter
 June 5 – Brenda Castillo, Dominican volleyball player
 June 6 – Hyuna, South Korean singer
 June 9 – Yannick Agnel, French Olympic swimmer
 June 10 – Kate Upton, American model and actress 
 June 11 
 Julian Alaphilippe, French professional road cyclist
 Davide Zappacosta, Italian footballer
 June 12 – Philippe Coutinho, Brazilian footballer
 June 13 – Krysta Palmer, American diver
 June 15 
 Mohamed Salah, Egyptian footballer
 Dafne Schippers, Dutch track and field athlete
 June 17 
 Mujinga Kambundji, Swiss sprinter
 Sun Yiwen, Chinese fencer
 June 21 – Max Schneider, American singer-songwriter and actor
 June 22 – Erika Kirpu, Estonian fencer
 June 23
 Bridget Sloan, American artistic gymnast
 Tugstsogt Nyambayar, Mongolian boxer
 June 24 – David Alaba, Austrian football player
 June 25 – Kelsey Robinson, American volleyball player
 June 26 
 Joel Campbell, Costa Rican footballer
 Rudy Gobert, French basketball player
 Jennette McCurdy, American actress and singer
 Manpreet Singh, Indian field hockey player
 June 27 
 Ahn So-hee, South Korean actress and singer
 Ferry Weertman, Dutch swimmer
 June 28 – Elaine Thompson-Herah, Jamaican track and field sprinter
 June 29 
 Rose Namajunas, American mixed martial artist
 Michalina Olszańska, Polish actress and writer

July

 July 1 – Ásgeir Trausti, Icelandic singer-songwriter and musician
 July 2 – Nana Takagi, Japanese speed skater
 July 3
 Nathalia Ramos, Spanish actress
 Maasa Sudo, Japanese singer
 July 8
 Sky Ferreira, American singer, songwriter, model, and actress
 Son Heung-min, South Korean footballer
 Sandi Morris, American pole vaulter
 July 9 
 Douglas Booth, English actor
 Kim So-yeong, South Korean badminton player
 July 11 – Mohamed Elneny, Egyptian footballer
 July 13 – Julie Leth, Danish cyclist
 July 15 – Wayde van Niekerk, South African athlete
 July 17 – Billie Lourd, American actress
 July 18 – Mehdi Taremi, Iranian footballer
 July 19 – Ellie Rowsell, English singer-songwriter and musician
 July 20 
 Lyudmyla Kichenok, Ukrainian tennis player
 Nadiia Kichenok, Ukrainian tennis player
 July 21 – Julia Beljajeva, Estonian fencer
 July 22 – Selena Gomez, American singer, songwriter, and actress
 July 30 – Fabiano Caruana, Italian-American chess player
 July 31 
 Kiara Advani, Indian actress
 Kyle Larson, American racing driver

August

 August 2
Hallie Eisenberg, American actress
Charli XCX, English singer
 August 3 – Karlie Kloss, American model
 August 4
 Daniele Garozzo, Italian fencer
 Cole Sprouse, American actor
 Dylan Sprouse, American actor and entrepreneur
 August 5 – Estavana Polman, Dutch handball player
 August 10 – Sun Yujie, Chinese fencer
 August 12 – Cara Delevingne, English model, actress, and singer
 August 13 – Lucas Moura, Brazilian footballer
 August 14 – Josh Bell, American baseball player
 August 16 
 Diego Schwartzman, Argentine tennis player
 Nur Tatar, Turkish tawkwando practitioner
 August 17 
 Paige, English professional wrestler
 Harald Reinkind, Norwegian handball player
 August 18 – Frances Bean Cobain, American visual artist
 August 20 
Neslihan Atagül, Turkish actress
Demi Lovato, American singer-songwriter and actor
 August 21 – Felipe Nasr, Brazilian racing driver 
 August 23 – Tina Rupprecht, German boxer
 August 25
 Miyabi Natsuyaki, Japanese singer
 Ricardo Rodríguez, Swiss footballer
 Ferran Solé, Spanish handball player
 Miguel Trauco, Peruvian footballer
 August 26 – Yang Yilin, Chinese artistic gymnast
 August 27 – Blake Jenner, American actor
 August 28 – Bismack Biyombo, Congolese basketball player
 August 31 – Nicolás Tagliafico, Argentine footballer

September

 September 1 
 Kirani James, Grenadian sprinter
 Coralie Lassource, French handball player
 September 2 – Emiliano Martínez, Argentine footballer
 September 7 – Tove Alexandersson, Swedish orienteer, ski orienteer, skyrunner and ski mountaineer
 September 11 – María Gabriela de Faría, Venezuelan actress and singer
 September 12 – Mahmood, Italian singer-songwriter
 September 14
 Connor Fields, American BMX cyclist
 Danielle Williams, Jamaican athlete
 September 16 – Nick Jonas, American singer-songwriter and actor
 September 18 
 Kendra Harrison, American hurdler
 Joji, Japanese singer and record producer
 September 19 – Diego Antonio Reyes, Mexican footballer
 September 20 – Safura Alizadeh,  Azerbaijani singer, actress, and saxophonist
 September 21
 Alireza Beiranvand, Iranian footballer
 Devyn Marble, American basketball player
 Mariya Muzychuk, Ukrainian chess player
 September 22 – Philip Hindes, British cyclist
 September 24 – Jack Sock, American tennis player
 September 25 
 Massimo Luongo, Australian footballer
 Rosalía, Spanish singer
 September 27 – Granit Xhaka, Swiss footballer
 September 28 – Kōko Tsurumi, Japanese artistic gymnast

October

 October 2 – Alisson Becker, Brazilian footballer
 October 6 – Yair Rodríguez, Mexican mixed martial artist
 October 7 – Mookie Betts, American baseball player
 October 8 
 Chelsea Gray, American basketball player
 Terran Petteway, American basketball player
 October 10 
 Gabrielle Aplin, English singer and songwriter
 Melissa Humana-Paredes, Canadian beach volleyball player
 October 11 – Cardi B, American hip hop artist
 October 12 – Josh Hutcherson, American actor and producer
 October 14
Esra Bilgiç, Turkish actress
Ahmed Musa, Nigerian footballer
 October 16 – Bryce Harper, American baseball player
 October 20 – Ksenia Semyonova, Russian Olympic gymnast
 October 22
 21 Savage, American rapper
 Sofia Vassilieva, American actress
 October 23 – Álvaro Morata, Spanish footballer
 October 27 – Stephan El Shaarawy, Italian footballer
 October 29 
 Chris Buescher, American professional stock car racing driver
 Evan Fournier, American basketball player
 October 31 – Vanessa Marano, American actress

November

 November 3 – Willi Orbán, German born-Hungarian footballer
 November 5 
 Takuya Kai, Japanese baseball player
Athiya Shetty, Indian actress
Marco Verratti, Italian footballer
 November 10 
 Micha Hancock, American volleyball player
 Wilfried Zaha, English-born Ivorian footballer
 November 15 
 Katherine Espín, Ecuadorian model, lawyer, and beauty queen who held the Miss Earth 2016.
 Sofia Goggia, Italian alpine skier
 November 16 – Marcelo Brozović, Croatian footballer
 November 18 
 Nathan Kress, American actor, director, and former child model
 Henry Martín, Mexican footballer
 November 21 – Mireia Lalaguna, Spanish actress and model
 November 23
 Miley Cyrus, American singer-songwriter and actress
 Gabriel Landeskog, Swedish hockey player
 November 27 – Park Chanyeol, South Korean rapper, singer-songwriter, actor, and model

December

 December 3 – Jessy Mendiola, Filipina actress
 December 4 – Kim Seok-jin, South Korean singer
 December 9 – Sarah Hirini, New Zealand rugby union player
 December 11 – Galal Yafai, British boxer
 December 12 – Chen Ruolin, Chinese diver
 December 13 
 Anastasia Bryzgalova, Russian curler
 Matthijs Büchli, Dutch track cyclist
 December 14 – Tori Kelly, American singer and songwriter 
 December 15 – Jesse Lingard, English footballer
 December 16 – Tom Rogic, Australian footballer
 December 17 – Alex Dujshebaev, Spanish handball player
 December 18
 Ryan Crouser, American field athlete
 Bridgit Mendler, American actress, singer-songwriter, and musician
 December 24 – Serge Aurier, Ivorian professional footballer

Deaths

January

 

 January 1 – Grace Hopper, American computer scientist (b. 1906)
 January 2 – Virginia Field, British actress (b. 1917)
 January 3 – Dame Judith Anderson, Australian-born British actress (b. 1897)
 January 7 – Richard Hunt, American puppeteer (b. 1951)
 January 13 – Mehdi Abbasov, Azerbaijani minister (b. 1960)
 January 18 – Alexander Almetov, Soviet Olympic ice hockey player (b. 1940)
 January 21 – Eddie Mabo, Australian Indigenous rights activist (b. 1936)
 January 23 – Freddie Bartholomew, English-American actor (b. 1924)
 January 26 – José Ferrer, Puerto Rican-American actor (b. 1912)
 January 27 – Sally Hayfron, First Lady of Zimbabwe (b. 1933)
 January 29 – Willie Dixon, American blues composer and musician (b. 1915)

February

 February 4 – Lisa Fonssagrives, Swedish model (b. 1911)
 February 10 – Alex Haley, American author (b. 1921)
 February 11 – Ray Danton, American actor (b. 1931)
 February 12 – Bep van Klaveren, Dutch boxer (b. 1907)
 February 13 – Nikolay Bogolyubov, Russian mathematician and physicist (b. 1909)
 February 15 – William Schuman, American composer (b. 1910)
 February 16
 Angela Carter, English novelist and journalist (b. 1940)
 Abbas al-Musawi, Lebanese Shia cleric and Secretary General of Hezbollah (b. 1952)
 Jânio Quadros, 22nd President of Brazil (b. 1917)
 February 20
 Roberto D'Aubuisson, Salvadorean Army officer and right-wing political leader (b. 1944)
 Dick York, American actor (b. 1928)
 February 22 – Sudirman Arshad, Malaysian singer and songwriter (b. 1954)
 February 23 – Markos Vafiadis, Greek Communist leader (b. 1906)
 February 27 – Algirdas Julien Greimas,  French-Lithuanian literary scientist (b. 1917)

March

 March 2 – Sandy Dennis, American actress (b. 1937)
 March 4 – Néstor Almendros, Spanish cinematographer (b. 1930)
 March 9 – Menachem Begin, Israel politician, 6th Prime Minister of Israel, recipient of the Nobel Peace Prize (b. 1913)
 March 11
 László Benedek, Hungarian film director (b. 1905)
 Richard Brooks, American film director (b. 1912)
 March 14 – Jean Poiret, French actor, screenwriter. and director (b. 1926)
 March 17 – Jack Arnold, American television and film director (b. 1912)
 March 19 – Cesare Danova, Italian-American actor (b. 1926)
 March 20 
 Lina Bo Bardi, Italian-born Brazilian architect (b. 1914)
 Georges Delerue, French composer (b. 1925)
 March 21 – John Ireland, Canadian actor (b. 1914)
 March 23 – Friedrich Hayek, Austrian economist, Nobel Prize laureate (b. 1899)
 March 25 – Nancy Walker, American actress and comedian (b. 1922)
 March 27 – Harald Sæverud, Norwegian composer (b. 1897)
 March 28 – Nikolaos Platon, Greek archaeologist (b. 1909)
 March 29 – Paul Henreid, Austrian-born American actor (b. 1908)
 March 30 – Manolis Andronikos, Greek archaeologist (b. 1919)

April

 April 2 – Juan Gómez González, Juanito, Spanish footballer (b. 1954)
 April 4 – Samuel Reshevsky, Polish chess player, seven-time U.S. Chess Champion (b. 1911)
 April 5 – Sam Walton, American businessman, founder of Wal-Mart (b. 1918)
 April 6 – Isaac Asimov, Russian-born author (b. 1920)
 April 7 – Ace Bailey, Canadian hockey player (b. 1903)
 April 8 – Daniel Bovet, Swiss-born pharmacologist, recipient of the Nobel Prize in Physiology or Medicine (b. 1907)
 April 10
 Peter D. Mitchell, British biochemist, recipient of the Nobel Prize in Chemistry (b. 1920)
 April 13 – Feza Gürsey, Turkish mathematician and physicist (b. 1921)
 Daniel Pollock, Australian actor (b. 1968)
 April 16 – Neville Brand, American actor (b. 1920)
 April 19 – Frankie Howerd, British comedian and actor (b. 1917)
 April 20 – Benny Hill, British comedian and actor (b. 1924)
 April 21 – Väinö Linna, Finnish author (b. 1920)
 April 23
 Tanka Prasad Acharya, Nepalese politician, 19th Prime Minister of Nepal (b. 1912)
 Satyajit Ray, Indian filmmaker (b. 1921)
 April 25 – Yutaka Ozaki, Japanese songwriter (b. 1965)
 April 27 – Olivier Messiaen, French composer (b. 1908)
 April 28 – Francis Bacon, Irish-born British painter (b. 1909)
 April 29 – Mae Clarke, American actress (b. 1910)

May

 May 3 – George Murphy, American actor and politician (b. 1902)
 May 6 – Marlene Dietrich, German actress (b. 1901)
 May 8 – Otto Šimánek, Czech actor (b. 1925)
 May 10 – John Lund, American actor (b. 1911)
 May 12 – Robert Reed, American actor (b. 1932)
 May 14
 Lyle Alzado, American football player (b. 1949)
 Nie Rongzhen, Chinese Communist military leader (b. 1899)
 May 17 – Lawrence Welk, American musician (b. 1903)
 May 23
 Giovanni Falcone, Italian judge (b. 1939)
 Atahualpa Yupanqui, Argentine singer, songwriter, and guitarist (b. 1908)
 May 25
 Tulio Demicheli, Argentine film director (b. 1914)
 Philip Habib, Lebanese-born American diplomat (b. 1920)
 May 30 – Karl Carstens, German politician and statesman, 7th President of the Federal Republic of Germany (West Germany) (b. 1914)

June

 June 3 – Robert Morley, English actor (b. 1908)
 June 18
 Peter Allen, Australian singer, songwriter (b. 1944)
 Mordecai Ardon, Israeli painter  (b. 1896)
 June 19 – Kathleen McKane Godfree, British tennis player (b. 1896)
 June 21
 Joan Fuster, Spanish writer (b. 1922)
 Li Xiannian, 3rd President of the People's Republic of China and one of the Eight Elders of the Chinese Communist Party (b. 1909)
 June 25 – Sir James Stirling, British architect (b. 1926)
 June 26 – Buddy Rogers, American wrestler (b. 1921)
 June 27 – Allan Jones, American actor (b. 1907)
 June 28
 Qian Sanqiang, Chinese nuclear physicist (b. 1913)
 Mikhail Tal, eighth World Chess Champion (b. 1936)
 June 29 – Mohamed Boudiaf, Algerian politician, President of Algeria (b. 1919; assassinated)

July

 July 2 – Camarón de la Isla, Spanish flamenco singer (b. 1950)
 July 4
 Francis Perrin, French nuclear physicist (b. 1901)
 Ástor Piazzolla, Argentine tango composer (b. 1921)
 July 7 – Josy Barthel, Luxembourgish Olympic athlete (b. 1927)
 July 9 – Eric Sevareid, American journalist (b. 1912)
 July 10 – Albert Pierrepoint, British executioner (b. 1905)
 July 11 – Deng Yingchao, Chinese Communist politician, widow of Zhou Enlai (b. 1904)
 July 15 – Hammer DeRoburt, 1st President of Nauru (b. 1922)
 July 18 – Mordecai Ardon,  Israeli painter (b. 1896)
 July 19
 Paolo Borsellino, Italian judge (b. 1940)
 Allen Newell, American computer scientist (b. 1927)
 July 22
 Suleiman Frangieh, Lebanese politician, 5th President of Lebanon (b. 1910)
 John Meyendorff, Russian scholar (b. 1926)
 July 23 – Rosemary Sutcliff, British author (b. 1920)
 July 24 
 Arletty, French singer and actress (b. 1898)
 Gavriil Ilizarov, Soviet physician and inventor (b. 1921)
 July 25 – Alfred Drake, American actor (b. 1914)
 July 26 – Mary Wells, American singer (b. 1943)
 July 30
 Brenda Marshall, American actress (b. 1915)
 Joe Shuster, Canadian-American comic book artist (b. 1914)
July 31 – Leonard Cheshire, British war hero, activist, and philanthropist (b. 1917)

August

 August 2 – Michel Berger, French singer-songwriter (b. 1947)
 August 3
 Wang Hongwen, Chinese Communist politician (b. 1935)
 Bertil Ohlin, Swedish economist and politician (b. 1899)
 August 4
 Seichō Matsumoto, Japanese writer and journalist (b. 1909)
 František Tomášek, Czech Roman Catholic prelate (b. 1899)
 August 5
 Robert Muldoon, 31st Prime Minister of New Zealand (b. 1921)
 Jeff Porcaro, American musician (b. 1954)
 August 7 – Francisco Fernández Ordóñez, Spanish politician, former Foreign minister (b. 1930)
 August 8 – Abu al-Qasim al-Khoei, Iranian-Iraqi Shia ayatollah and scholar (b. 1899)
 August 12 – John Cage, American composer (b. 1912)
 August 18
 John Sturges, American film director (b. 1911)
 Chris McCandless, American hiker and explorer (b. 1968)
 August 29 – Félix Guattari, French psychotherapist, philosopher and semiologist (b. 1930)

September

 September 1 – Piotr Jaroszewicz, Polish politician, Prime Minister of Poland (b. 1909)
 September 2 – Barbara McClintock, American geneticist, recipient of the Nobel Prize in Physiology or Medicine (b. 1902)
 September 5 – Fritz Leiber, American author (b. 1910)
 September 6 – Mervyn Johns, Welsh actor (b. 1899)
 September 12 – Anthony Perkins, American actor and singer (b. 1932)
 September 18 – Princess Margaret of Denmark (b. 1895)
 September 21 – Bill Williams, American actor (b. 1915)
 September 25 – César Manrique, Spanish artist (b. 1919)
 September 27 – Zhang Leping, Chinese comic artist (b. 1910)

October

 October 4 – Denny Hulme, New Zealand racing driver (b. 1936)
 October 5 – Eddie Kendricks, American singer (b. 1939)
 October 6 – Denholm Elliott, English actor (b. 1922)
 October 7 
 Allan Bloom, American philosopher and author (b. 1930)
 Tevfik Esenç, last known speaker of Ubykh (b. 1904)
 October 8 – Willy Brandt, 29th Chancellor of the Federal Republic of Germany (West Germany), recipient of the Nobel Peace Prize (b. 1913)
 October 14 – Willie Waddell, Scottish footballer (b. 1921)
 October 15 – Oliver Franks, Baron Franks, British civil servant, diplomat, and philosopher (b. 1905)
 October 16 – Shirley Booth, American actress (b. 1898)
 October 19
 Gert Bastian, German politician (b. 1923)
 Petra Kelly, German politician (b. 1947)
 Arthur Wint, Jamaican Olympic runner (b. 1920)
 October 21 – Jim Garrison, American attorney (b. 1921)
 October 22 – Cleavon Little, American actor (b. 1939)
 October 25
 Adelino da Palma Carlos, Portuguese politician, 102nd Prime Minister of Portugal (b. 1905)
 Roger Miller, American singer-songwriter, musician, and actor (b. 1936)
 October 27 – David Bohm, American-born physicist, philosopher, and neuropsychologist (b. 1917)
 October 29 – Sir Kenneth MacMillan, British choreographer (b. 1929)

November

 November 2 – Hal Roach, American director and producer (b. 1892)
 November 4 – José Luis Sáenz de Heredia, Spanish film director (b. 1911)
 November 5 – Jan Oort, Dutch astronomer (b. 1900)
 November 7
 Alexander Dubček, Slovak politician, First Secretary of the Communist Party of Czechoslovakia (b. 1921)
 Jack Kelly, American actor (b. 1927)
 Richard Yates, American writer (b. 1926)
 November 10 – Chuck Connors, American actor, professional baseball and basketball player (b. 1921)
 November 11 – Earle Meadows, American Olympic athlete (b. 1913)
 November 14 – Ernst Happel, Austrian footballer and manager (b. 1925)
 November 21 – Kaysone Phomvihane, Laotian statesman and Communist Party leader, 11th Prime Minister of Laos and 2nd President of Laos (b. 1920)
 November 22 – Sterling Holloway, American actor (b. 1905)
 November 23 
 Roy Acuff, American singer (b. 1903)
 Mohamed Benhima, 5th Prime Minister of Morocco (b. 1924)
 November 25 – Joseph Arthur Ankrah, 2nd President of Ghana (b. 1903)
 November 29 
 Jean Dieudonné, French mathematician (b. 1906)
 Emilio Pucci, Italian fashion designer (b. 1914)

December

 December 3
 Luis Alcoriza, Mexican film director (b. 1918)
 Nureddin al-Atassi, Syrian Baathist, 54th Prime Minister of Syria and 17th President of Syria (b. 1929)
 December 9 – Vincent Gardenia, Italian-American actor (b. 1920)
 December 12
 Ali Amini, Iranian politician and 67th Prime Minister of Iran (b. 1905)
 Suzanne Lilar, Belgian essayist, novelist and playwright (b. 1901)
 Sir Robert Rex, 1st Premier of Niue (b. 1909)
 December 17 
 Günther Anders, German philosopher (b. 1902)
 Dana Andrews, American actor (b. 1909)
 December 21
 Stella Adler, American acting teacher (b. 1901)
 Albert King, American blues musician (b. 1923)
 Nathan Milstein, Ukrainian-born violinist (b. 1903)
 December 22 – Frederick William Franz, 4th President of Watch Tower Bible and Tract Society of Pennsylvania  (b. 1893)
 December 23 – Eddie Hazel, American guitarist (b. 1950)
 December 24 – Peyo, Belgian comics artist (b. 1928)
 December 26 – Nikita Magaloff, Georgian-Russian pianist (b. 1912)
 December 27 – Stephen Albert, American composer (b. 1941)
 December 30 – Lusine Zakaryan, Armenian soprano (b. 1937)

Nobel Prizes

Physics – Georges Charpak
Chemistry – Rudolph A. Marcus
Medicine – Edmond H. Fischer, Edwin G. Krebs
Literature – Derek Walcott
Peace – Rigoberta Menchú
Economics – Gary Becker

References

Sources
1992 House by Bill Frolick – article about 1992 from The New Yorker magazine.

 
Leap years in the Gregorian calendar